Hydroid may refer to:
Hydroid (zoology)
Hydroid (botany)
Hydroid Inc. (AUV manufacturer)